Stefano Mezzadri (born 26 May 1967) is a Swiss former professional tennis player.

Mezzadri appeared in his only Grand Prix circuit singles main draw at Geneva in 1987, with the tournament won by his younger brother Claudio, a Davis Cup representative for Switzerland. As a doubles player he was a semi-finalist at Geneva in 1990 and won one ATP Challenger title. He played in qualifiers at the 1987 Wimbledon Championships.

Challenger titles

Doubles: (1)

References

External links
 
 

1967 births
Living people
Swiss male tennis players
Swiss-Italian people